Aatma is a 2006 Indian Hindi-language horror film, also known as The Ghost, starring Kapil Jhaveri and Neha Bajpai in the lead roles. The film is directed by Deepak Ramsay with a screenplay by M. Salim and is produced by Tulsi Ramsay for Parallel Films and Tulsi Ramsay Productions. Aatma was first released in India on 19 May 2006.

Cast
 Kapil Jhaveri as Dr. Aman Mehra
 Neha Bajpai as Neha A. Mehra
 Vikram Singh as Inspector Siddharth Ghoshal
 Amriena as Aarti Kumar
 Mukesh Tiwari as Vikram Malhotra
 Sadashiv Amrapurkar as Advocate Khurana
 Beena Banerjee as Suman (as Beena)
 Amit Behl as Amit Chauhan
 Deep Dhillon as Avinash Malhotra
 Brij Gopal as Morgue Attendant
 Dinesh Hingoo as Phiroz Khadewala
 Yatin Karyekar as Yatin		
 Upasna Singh as Shanta
 Rajeev Verma as Suman's husband

Music
composer: Anu Malik. Lyrics: Sameer

"Bahon mein Chhupa Lo" - Sunidhi Chauhan
"Chori Chori Tum Dil Chura Lo" - Sadhana Sargam
"Ishq Huwa mujhe" - Asha Bhosle
"Kya Kare" - Sonu Nigam, Sunidhi Chauhan
"Sehma Sehma" - Khushboo Jain
"Tere Chehre Se Nazar Nahin" - Sonu Nigam, Sunidhi Chauhan

References

External links

Hindi-language horror films
2000s Hindi-language films
2006 films
Films scored by Anu Malik